Emily Woof is an English actress and author, best known for film and TV roles including Nancy in Oliver Twist, The Full Monty, an ITV adaptation of The Woodlanders, Velvet Goldmine, Wondrous Oblivion, Silent Cry and The League of Gentlemen's Apocalypse.

Early life
Woof was brought up in Newcastle upon Tyne Her father was Wordsworth Trust Director Dr. Robert Woof. Woof went on to study at Oxford University.

Acting
Her first stage work was a trilogy of one-woman plays: Sex, Sex 2, and Sex 3.

Parts in The Full Monty (1997), Photographing Fairies (1997), Velvet Goldmine (1998) and The Woodlanders (1998) established Emily Woof as one of Britain's leading young actresses.

She has also appeared in several television roles, ranging from period dramas (Middlemarch; Oliver Twist) to contemporary drama (Killer Net) and comedy (The Ronni Ancona Show). In 2016, she appeared in Coronation Street as the detective investigating the murder of Callum Logan (Sean Ward).

Author

For theatre she has written Sex, Sex II, Sex III,  and Revolver. For radio, she wrote Pianoman, Baby Love, and Home to The Black Sea. She has written and directed two short films, Between The Wars, and Meeting Helen.

Her first novel, The Whole Wide Beauty, was published in May 2010 by Faber & Faber.
Her second novel The Lightning Tree was also published by Faber, in March 2015.

Personal life
Woof is married to fellow actor/writer Hamish McColl. The couple have two children and live in North London.

Filmography
Film

Television

Short films

 Going Going... as Anna (2000 short film – actor and writer)
 Between the Wars (2002 short film – director) 
 Meeting Helen ... as Helen (2007 short film – actor, writer and director)

Awards and nominations
 Screen Actors Guild Award for Outstanding Performance by a Cast in a Motion Picture (won) – The Full Monty (shared with cast)
 American Film Institute Award for Best Performance by an Actress in a Supporting Role (nomination) – Passion
 London Film Critics' Circle Award for British Supporting Actress of the Year (nomination) – Wondrous Oblivion

References

External links
 

1967 births
Living people
Alumni of the University of Oxford
Outstanding Performance by a Cast in a Motion Picture Screen Actors Guild Award winners
Actresses from Newcastle upon Tyne
English writers
21st-century English actresses